Galaxy Surfactants Ltd. is an Indian multinational chemical company based in Mumbai, Maharashtra, India. It is a manufacturer of surfactants and speciality chemicals for cleaning and personal care space and its more than 200 products are exported to over 100 countries. Galaxy has over 1400 clients including L'Oréal, Unilever, Colgate-Palmolive, Dabur, Himalaya, and more. Performance surfactants account for 60% of revenue and specialty personal care products account for the rest.

Galaxy is considered a power-player in the global surfactants market. In 2020, the annual turnover was 2,563 crore. According to Unnathan Shekhar, managing director of Galaxy Surfactants, two-thirds of their business comes from international customers. In 2020, the company spent nearly 60 crore and filed for 62 patents.

History
The company was founded in 1980 by Unnathan Shekhar, Geera Ramakrishnan, Shashi Shanbhag, CR Ramakrishna, and Sudhir Patil; five friends, all aged 23, who all came from different backgrounds. They began their company as contract manufacturers for Colgate-Palmolive, producing Sodium laureth sulfate in a small lab in Ghatkopar.

In 1984, Galaxy opened its first plant at Tarapur and second plant for sulfonation was opened in Taloja in 1998.
Galaxy also started a research centre at Navi Mumbai in 1997.

In July 2009, Galaxy acquired TRI‐K Industries, a distributor and producer of specialty ingredients. This acquisition of a 30 year old New Jersey headquartered company gave the company a foothold in the United States with additional protein manufacturing facilities in New Hampshire.

In 2011, Galaxy commissioned manufacturing plants at Zaghadia in Gujarat and Suez in Egypt at the cost of 330 crore.

In 2012, Galaxy became a member of Roundtable on Sustainable Palm Oil, taking a step towards creating a sustainable palm oil supply chain.

In 2018, Galaxy floated their IPO and was listed on the Indian stock exchanges (BSE & NSE).

Financials 
It registered 2627.38 crores total income in the fiscal year 2022, while 1834.90 crores in 2021. The company reported a turnover of 2,563 crore in the financial year 2020.

References

External links

Manufacturing companies based in Mumbai
Chemical companies established in 1980
Chemical companies of India
Indian companies established in 1980
Indian brands
1980 establishments in Maharashtra
Companies listed on the National Stock Exchange of India
Companies listed on the Bombay Stock Exchange